Alingsås VBK is a volleyball club in Alingsås, Sweden. Established on 1 June 1961, it joined the Swedish Volleyball Federation on 19 December the same year. The club won the Swedish women's national championship in 1971.

References

1961 establishments in Sweden
Sport in Västra Götaland County
Volleyball clubs established in 1961
Swedish volleyball clubs